Bogues is a surname. Notable people with the surname include:

B. Anthony Bogues, Caribbean political theorist, historian, writer, and curator
Leon Bogues (1927–1985), American politician
Muggsy Bogues (born 1965), American basketball player